Chap Darreh may refer to:
 Chap Darreh, West Azerbaijan
 Chap Darreh, Zanjan